Jodhi is a given name. Notable people with the name include:

 Jodhi Bibi (1573–1619), popularly known as Jagat Gosain, Mughal Empress
 Jodhi Meares (born 1971), Australian fashion designer and former model
 Jodhi May (born 1975), English actress

See also
 Anandha Jodhi, a 1963 Tamil language film